Sweden participated at the 1964 Winter Olympics in Innsbruck, Austria, sending 57 representatives to compete in eight different events. The team finished seventh overall, winning seven medals including three golds. Five of the team's medals came from cross-country skiing and one each from speed skating and men's ice hockey.

Medalists

Alpine skiing

Men

Men's slalom

Biathlon

Men

 1 Two minutes added per miss.

Bobsleigh

Cross-country skiing

Men

Men's 4 × 10 km relay

Women

Women's 3 x 5 km relay

Figure skating

Women

Ice hockey

Summary

First round
Winners (in bold) qualified for the Group A to play for 1st-8th places. Teams, which lost their qualification matches, played in Group B for 9th-16th places.

|}

Medal round 

Canada 3–1 Sweden
Sweden 7–4 USA
Sweden 7–0 Finland
Sweden 10–2 Germany (UTG)
Sweden 12–0 Switzerland
Soviet Union 4–2 Sweden
Sweden 8–3 Czechoslovakia

Leading scorers

Ski jumping

Speed skating

Men

Women

References
 Olympic Winter Games 1964, full results by sports-reference.com

Nations at the 1964 Winter Olympics
1964 Winter Olympics
Winter Olympics